Yala  is a Local Government Area in Cross River State, Nigeria.

It has an area of 1,739 km2 and a population of 210,843 at the 2006 census. This makes Yala the second most populated LGA in Cross River State, coming after Akpabuyo.

The postal code of the area is 550.

The dominant tribe in the Area are the Yala. Major settlements in Yala LGA include Okpoma, Okuku, Yahe, Ugaga, Ijegu, Oloko, Imaje, Oke, Echumoga, Woda, Ebo, Igede Edii Nation, Itekpa, Maa, Wonye, Uchu, Osina, Mbuor, Aliforkpa, Echumofana, Wanihem, Wanikade, Wanokom, Ijiraga, Ntrigom etc. Yala is also a language spoken by some inhabitants of Yalaland.

Other major tribes in Yala Local Government Area are, Igede-Edii (Anyadaha, Anyugbe, Eminyi, Ibilla, Igbakobor and Opiriku), Itekpa, Gabu, Ukele and Yache. They speak Igede, Kukelle and Yache language respectively.

The LGA has abundant salt deposit which can sustain any small to medium scale salt industry. There are many salt ponds in Okpoma which are of great history to the people and are mined locally. The LGA also offers a wide range of investment opportunities in agro-based industries as well as solid mineral industries.

History

The Yala people are closely related to the Idoma people of Benue state, Nigeria and can understand their language. It is said that the Yala people left Benue state in search of salt, having found it in abundance in present day Yala, decided to stay.

See also
Cross River State
In Yala local government area, there is an ongoing construction of a rice industry, located on a land mass from between Okuku heading towards Igoli road through the Army Barracks. There is a roofing tiles factory in Yala.
The Yala people are predominantly farmers, civil servants, and law enforcement officers. A significant number of the youths work as traders, craftsmen and commercial motorcyclists.

In Yala, the most celebrated agricultural produce is the yam. An entire day is declared as a holiday to celebrate the yam every new harvest time which is usually on the 30th of August annually. This sees Yala people from all around the world return home to enjoy a cultural heritage festival and Holiday.

References
4.   "We Are Idomas And Not Cross Riverians; Yala People"       http://www.iambenue.com/we-are-idomas-and-not-cross-riverians-yala-people/

Local Government Areas in Cross River State